The Last Beautiful Day is an album by New Buffalo, released on 14 September 2004.

Track listing
 "Recovery" - 3:41
 "I've Got You and You've Got Me (Song of Contentment)" - 3:54
 "No Party" - 3:06
 "It'll Be Alright" - 3:31
 "Time to Go to Sleep" - 4:03
 "Yes" - 3:10
 "Inside" - 4:16
 "Come Back" - 4:08
 "While You're Away" - 3:30
 "On Sunday" - 2:43

Personnel

Beth Orton - backing vocals (7)
Jim White - drums (3,7,9)
Tony Espie - mixing (1,3)

All other songs mixed by New Buffalo.
All songs were recorded at The Lonely Studio from May 2003 to December 2003.
All songs written, recorded and produced by New Buffalo.

2004 albums
Sally Seltmann albums
Arts & Crafts Productions albums